Kai Freddie Selvon (born 13 April 1992 in Arima) is a Trinidadian track and field sprinter. At the 2012 Summer Olympics, she competed in the Women's 200 metres. She also represented her country at the World Championships in Athletics in 2011 and 2013.

References

1992 births
Living people
Trinidad and Tobago female sprinters
Olympic athletes of Trinidad and Tobago
Athletes (track and field) at the 2012 Summer Olympics
Athletes (track and field) at the 2020 Summer Olympics
Athletes (track and field) at the 2014 Commonwealth Games
Athletes (track and field) at the 2018 Commonwealth Games
Commonwealth Games competitors for Trinidad and Tobago
World Athletics Championships athletes for Trinidad and Tobago
People from Arima
Olympic female sprinters
Trinidad and Tobago people of Indian descent